John W. Kawaja (born April 27, 1961 in Chandler, Quebec) is a Canadian curler. He is a two-time Brier and World Champion.

Career
Kawaja moved to Ontario as a youth, and became a high-profile skip (he won the 1980 Ontario junior championship), but it was not until his move to the Ed Werenich rink that he finally started to win championships. In 1983, Kawaja won his first provincial championship, playing second for Werenich. The team not only won the provincial championship, but they won the Brier and the World Curling Championship as well that year. Kawaja is the youngest player to have ever won the Brier (21 years old). In 1984, the team repeated their provincial championship, but lost in the Brier final to Michael Riley's Manitoba rink. Kawaja was promoted to the third position for Werenich, and in 1990 won his third provincial title. The team followed up with another Brier and World Championship. Kawaja won two more provincial titles with Werenich in 1995 and 1997. He and Ed Werenich formed the nucleus of teams that won more money than any curling team in the 1980s and 90s.

Kawaja was named to the Canadian Curling Hall of Fame in 1991. In 2009, Kawaja and his 1983 world champion team (Werenich, Paul Savage and John Kawaja) were inducted into the Ontario Sports Hall of Fame.

Kawaja retired from curling in 1997. After working with Bata Shoes to work on a curling shoe design, he moved on to work with Adidas after retiring from curling. He later became president of the Taylormade golf company. He resides in San Diego, California.

References

External links
 
 Ontario Sports Legends Hall of Fame

1961 births
Living people
Brier champions
World curling champions
Curlers from Ontario
Canadian male curlers
People from Gaspésie–Îles-de-la-Madeleine